This is complete bibliography of American science fiction and fantasy author Dave Wolverton, who also writes under the pseudonym David Farland.

Bibliography

Original works

Essays and articles
 The Writers of the Future Decade (1994) – Originally published in L. Ron Hubbard Presents Writers of the Future, Volume X
 About the Writers and Illustrators of the Future (1995) – Originally published in L. Ron Hubbard Presents Writers of the Future, Volume XI

Novelettes
 The Sky is an Open Highway (1988) – Originally published in the July edition of Isaac Asimov's Science Fiction Magazine
 My Favorite Christmas (1993) – Originally published in Christmas Forever
 We Blazed (1995) – Originally published in Peter S. Beagle's Immortal Unicorn
 In the Teeth of Glory (1995) – Originally published in David Copperfield's Tales of the Impossible
 The Stone Mother's Curse (1996) – Originally published in Return to Avalon
 My Favorite Christmas (2001) – Published in Leading Edge issue No. 41

Novels
 On My Way to Paradise (1989)
 Wheatfields Beyond (1993)
 A Very Strange Trip (1999), based on a story by L. Ron Hubbard
 In the Company of Angels (2009)

Short stories
 "The Sky is an Open Highway" (1985) – published in Leading Edge, issue No. 10
 "On My Way to Paradise" (1989) – Originally published in L. Ron Hubbard Presents Writers of the Future, Vol. III
 "After a Lean Winter" (1996) -  Originally published in War of the Worlds: Global Dispatches
 "A Rarefied View at Dawn" (2005) – published in Orson Scott Card's InterGalactic Medicine Show, issue No. 1
 "The Mooncalfe" (2006) – published in Orson Scott Card's InterGalactic Medicine Show, issue No. 2
 "Sweetly The Dragon Dreams" (2008) – published in Orson Scott Card's InterGalactic Medicine Show, cover story, issue No. 10
 "Feeding the Feral Children" (2011)
 "A Rarefield View at Dawn" (2011)
 "No Bird" (2012)
 "At the Virgin's Doorstep" (2012)
 "Skyfish" (2012)
 "Homo Perfectus" (2013) – published in The Mad Scientist's Guide to World Domination

Series

Serpent Catch
 Spirit Walker (1991)
 Serpent Catch (1991)
 Blade Kin (1993)
 Path of the Crushed Heart (1993)

Ravenspell
 Of Mice And Magic  (2005) Published by Covenant Communications
 The Wizard of Ooze (2007) Published by Covenant Communications
 Freaky Flyday (2009) Published by Covenant Communications

The Golden Queen
 The Golden Queen (1994)
 Beyond the Gate (1995)
 Lords of the Seventh Swarm (1997)

The Runelords
(Published under the pseudonym David Farland)
 The Sum of All Men (1998)
 Brotherhood of the Wolf (1999)
 Wizardborn (2001)
 The Lair of Bones (2003)
 Sons of the Oak (2006)
 Worldbinder (2007)
 The Wyrmling Horde (2008)
 Chaosbound (2009)
 A Tale of Tales (Forthcoming)

Mummy Chronicles
 Revenge of the Scorpion King (2001)
 Heart of the Pharaoh (2001)
 The Curse of the Nile (2001)
 Flight of the Phoenix (2001)

Nightingale
 Nightingale (2011)
 Dream Assassin (Forthcoming)
 Draghoul (Forthcoming)
 Shadow Lord (Forthcoming)

Pre-existing series

Star Wars
 The Courtship of Princess Leia (1994)

Star Wars: Jedi Apprentice
 The Rising Force (1999)

Gamebooks

Star Wars Episode I Adventures
1. The Ghostling Children (2000)
2. The Hunt for Anakin Skywalker (2000)
3. Capture Arawynne (2000)
4. Trouble on Tatooine (2000)

Star Wars Missions
1. The Search for Grubba the Hutt (1998)
2. The Hunt For Han Solo (1998)
3. Ithorian Invasion (1997)

References

Bibliographies by writer
Bibliographies of American writers
Fantasy bibliographies
Science fiction bibliographies